James Benjamin Homestead is a historic home located at Flanders in Suffolk County, New York. It consists of a main section, built about 1785, which is a two-story, center-entrance residence, and one- and two-story rear additions, built about 1900. Also on the property is a small, late 19th-century barn.

The house is hidden behind trees along New York State Route 24 and is a waterfront property along Reeves Bay, a segment of Flanders Bay, which is located between the Peconic River and the Great Peconic Bay.

It was added to the National Register of Historic Places in 1986.

References
 

Houses on the National Register of Historic Places in New York (state)
Houses completed in 1785
Houses in Suffolk County, New York
National Register of Historic Places in Suffolk County, New York